The Vicente Calderón Stadium was the home stadium of Atlético Madrid from its completion in 1966 to 2017, with a seating capacity of 54,907 and located on the banks of the Manzanares, in the Arganzuela district of Madrid, Spain. The stadium was originally called the Estadio Manzanares, but this was later changed to the Vicente Calderón Stadium, in honour of their long-term President Vicente Calderón. The stadium closed in 2017 after the conclusion of the 2016-17 season, with Atlético Madrid moving to Metropolitano Stadium for the following season. Demolition began in 2019 and completed the following year.

A notable, and rather spectacular feature of the Vicente Calderón, was that the M-30 dual carriageway, running from the South Node Toledo Bridge, passed below one of the main stands.

History
Construction of a new stadium to replace El Metropolitano originally began in 1959, but came to a halt following financial problems. The ground eventually opened in 1966 as the Estadio del Manzanares, being renamed Vicente Calderón in 1972.

Departure of Atlético 
The final match at the stadium was on 28 May 2017, between a past and present Atlético side and a world XI.

On September 23, 1992, Michael Jackson held a sold-out concert as part of his Dangerous World Tour to 54,907 people. During his stay in Madrid, he visited numerous hospitals where sick children were kept who needed treatment and help for diseases and other conditions that were discovered during birth. Bruce Springsteen played at the Vicente Calderon in front of 62.000 people on August 2, 1988. Mexican pop group RBD recorded their Hecho en España DVD on June 22, 2007 during their Tour Celestial at the stadium. This tour spawned eight concerts throughout Spain.

Location
The Estadio Vicente Calderón was located on the banks of the Manzanares river. The closest metro station to the grounds was Pirámides, located on Line 5.

Copa del Rey finals
The stadium hosted the final of the Copa del Rey (also previously known as the Copa del Generalísimo) on 14 occasions: 1973, 1974, 1975, 1977, 1979, 1981, 1986, 1989, 1994, 2005, 2008, 2012, 2016, and 2017.

1982 FIFA World Cup
The stadium hosted three games in the 1982 FIFA World Cup:

References

External links

Estadios de España
Stadium Guide Article
Stadium photos at World Stadiums

Atlético Madrid
Football venues in Madrid
Sports venues completed in 1966
Sports venues demolished in 2020
1982 FIFA World Cup stadiums
Buildings and structures in Arganzuela District, Madrid
1966 establishments in Spain
2020 disestablishments in Spain